The North York Rangers were a junior ice hockey team. They originated in 1967, when the Woodbridge Rangers of the Metro Junior B League moved to North York. The team operated out of the Metro League until the Ontario Junior Hockey League was founded in 1972, at which point the Rangers and four other Metro teams moved to the new league. The Rangers made it to the Royal Bank Cup in 1980 and 1983. In 1984, the team was renamed the North York Red Wings and folded after one season.

Season-by-season results

Regular season

Playoffs
1973 DNQ
1974 Lost Semi-final
North York Rangers defeated Dixie Beehives 4-games-to-3
Aurora Tigers defeated North York Rangers 4-games-to-none
1975 Lost Semi-final
North York Rangers defeated Whitby Knob Hill Farms 4-games-to-1
Wexford Raiders defeated North York Rangers 4-games-to-3
1976 Lost Final
North York Rangers defeated Ajax Knob Hill Farms 4-games-to-1 with 1 tie
North York Rangers defeated Toronto Nationals 4-games-to-1
North Bay Trappers defeated North York Rangers 4-games-to-3
1977 Won League, Won OHA Buckland Cup, Lost Hewitt-Dudley Memorial Trophy semi-final
North York Rangers defeated Richmond Hill Rams 4-games-to-1
North York Rangers defeated Royal York Royals 4-games-to-2
North York Rangers defeated North Bay Trappers 4-games-to-1 OPJHL CHAMPIONS
North York Rangers defeated Guelph Platers (SOJHL) 4-games-to-3 BUCKLAND CUP CHAMPIONS
North York Rangers defeated Thunder Bay Eagles (TBJHL) 4-games-to-1
Pembroke Lumber Kings (CJHL) defeated North York Rangers 4-games-to-2
1978 Lost Quarter-final
North Bay Trappers defeated North York Rangers 4-games-to-1
1979 Lost Semi-final
North York Rangers defeated Royal York Royals 4-games-to-3
Guelph Platers defeated North York Rangers 4-games-to-none
1980 Won League, Won OHA Buckland Cup, Won Dudley Hewitt Cup, Lost 1980 Centennial Cup final
North York Rangers defeated Guelph Platers 4-games-to-3
North York Rangers defeated Dixie Beehives 4-games-to-2
North York Rangers defeated Royal York Royals 4-games-to-1 OPJHL CHAMPIONS
North York Rangers defeated Onaping Falls Huskies (NOJHL) 3-games-to-none BUCKLAND CUP CHAMPIONS
North York Rangers defeated Thunder Bay North Stars (TBJHL) 4-games-to-none
North York Rangers defeated Joliette Cyclones (QJAHL) 4-games-to-2 DUDLEY HEWITT CUP CHAMPIONS
Second in 1980 Centennial Cup round robin (2-2)
Red Deer Rustlers (AJHL) defeated North York Rangers 3-2 in final
1981 Lost Semi-final
North York Rangers defeated Dixie Beehives 4-games-to-1
Guelph Platers defeated North York Rangers 4-games-to-3
1982 Lost Quarter-final
Guelph Platers defeated North York Rangers 4-games-to-none
1983 Won League, Won OHA Buckland Cup, Won Dudley Hewitt Cup, Won Eastern Canada Championship, Won 1983 Centennial Cup
North York Rangers defeated Cambridge Winterhawks 4-games-to-none
North York Rangers defeated Hamilton Mountain A's 4-games-to-3
North York Rangers defeated Orillia Travelways 4-games-to-none OJHL CHAMPIONS
North York Rangers defeated Elliot Lake Vikings (NOJHL) 3-games-to-2 BUCKLAND CUP CHAMPIONS
North York Rangers defeated Thunder Bay Kings (TBJHL) 4-games-to-none DUDLEY HEWITT CUP CHAMPIONS
North York Rangers defeated Halifax Lions (MVJHL) 4-games-to-1 EASTERN CANADA CHAMPIONS
North York Rangers defeated Abbotsford Flyers (BCJHL) 4-games-to-none CENTENNIAL CUP CHAMPIONS
1984 Lost Semi-final
North York Rangers defeated Richmond Hill Dynes 4-games-to-2
Orillia Travelways defeated North York Rangers 4-games-to-none
1985 Lost Quarter-final
Aurora Tigers defeated North York Red Wings 4-games-to-none

NHL alumni
List of North York Rangers alumni to play in the National Hockey League (NHL).

 Paul Coffey
 Iain Duncan
 Paul Evans
 Mike Hartman
 Scott Howson
 Bob Hurlburt
 Ron Lalonde
 Ken Lockett
 Darren Lowe
 Jeff Madill
 Tom McCarthy
 Bernie Nicholls
 Gerry O'Flaherty
 Paul Pooley
 John Purves
 Steve Shutt

References

Defunct Ontario Provincial Junior A Hockey League teams
Ice hockey clubs established in 1966
Ice hockey teams in Toronto
North York
1966 establishments in Ontario
1985 disestablishments in Ontario
Sports clubs disestablished in 1985